The Central Zhdanovskoye mine is a large copper mine located in the north-west of Russia in Murmansk Oblast. Central Zhdanovskoye represents one of the largest copper reserve in Russia and in the world having estimated reserves of 4 billion tonnes of ore grading 0.24% copper.

See also 
 List of mines in Russia

References 

Copper mines in Russia